The Ngiyambaa language, also spelt Ngiyampaa, Ngempa, Ngemba and other variants, is a Pama–Nyungan language of the Wiradhuric subgroup. It was the traditional language of the Wangaibon and Weilwan peoples of New South Wales, Australia, but is now moribund; according to Donaldson by the 1970s there were only about ten people fluent in Wangaibon, whilst there were only a couple of Weilwan speakers left.

Ngiyambaa (meaning language), or Ngiyambaambuwali, was also used by the Wangaibon and Weilwan to describe themselves, whilst 'Wangaibon' and 'Weilwan' (meanining 'With Wangai/Weil' (for 'no') were used to distinguish both the language and the speakers from others who did not have wangai or weil for no.

Other Names
Other names for Ngiyambaa are: Giamba, Narran, Noongaburrah, Ngampah, Ngemba, Ngeumba, Ngiamba, Ngjamba, Ngiyampaa and Ngumbarr; Wangaibon is also called Wangaaybuwan and Wongaibon, and Weilwan is also called Wailwan, Wayilwan or Wailwun.

Phonology

Consonants

Vowels

References

Wiradhuric languages
Critically endangered languages
Endangered indigenous Australian languages in New South Wales